Fiona Walker (born 24 May 1944) is an English actress, known for numerous theatre and television roles between the 1960s and 1990s.

An early leading role was as Sue Bridehead in a BBC television production of Jude the Obscure (1971). She may be best remembered for playing Agrippina in the BBC adaptation of I, Claudius (1976), directed by Herbert Wise. She was Miss Meteyard, an intelligent, wise-cracking copy-writer modelled on the author, in Dorothy L. Sayers's Murder Must Advertise, a BBC TV dramatisation of 1973, and an acidic Mrs Elton in BBC2's 1972 adaptation of Jane Austen's Emma. She played the ill-fated Stella Mawson in Anglia's first P. D. James adaptation, Death of an Expert Witness (1983), also directed by Wise. Other television appearances have included All Creatures Great and Small (1978), Pope John Paul II (1984), Bleak House (1985), The Woman in Black (1989), (directed by her husband), Agatha Christie's Poirot (1993), and two Doctor Who serials, 24 years apart, playing villainesses Kala in The Keys of Marinus in 1964, and Lady Peinforte in Silver Nemesis in 1988, as well as a definitive Ruth in Alan Ayckbourn's trilogy The Norman Conquests – Thames Television (1977).

Her film roles included Liddy in Far from the Madding Crowd (1967), the cult horror film The Asphyx (1972), and Century (1993), starring Charles Dance and Clive Owen.

Walker married Herbert Wise in 1988. Her children, Charlie Walker-Wise and Susannah Wise, are also actors.

Partial filmography
Far from the Madding Crowd (1967) - Liddy
 Jude the Obscure (1971) - Sue Bridehead
The Asphyx (1972) - Anna Wheatley
The Woman in Black (1989) - Mrs. Toovey
Century (1993) - Mrs. Pritchard

References

External links
 

1944 births
English television actresses
Living people
Actresses from London
20th-century English actresses
English film actresses
English stage actresses